RU-57073 is a nonsteroidal antiandrogen which was never marketed. It shows 163% of the affinity of testosterone for the androgen receptor and negligible affinity for other steroid hormone receptors.

See also
 Cyanonilutamide
 Nilutamide
 RU-56187
 RU-58642
 RU-58841
 RU-59063

References

Abandoned drugs
Primary alcohols
Ketones
Imidazolines
Nitriles
Nonsteroidal antiandrogens
Organosulfur compounds
Trifluoromethyl compounds